The 2015–16 Syracuse Orange women's basketball team represents Syracuse University during the 2015–16 college basketball season. The Orange, led by ninth year head coach Quentin Hillsman. The Orange were third year members of the Atlantic Coast Conference and play their home games at the Carrier Dome.

Syracuse finished its regular season with a 23-6 overall record, matching the program record for most regular season wins. The Orange earned their highest finish as a member of the ACC, with a school-record 13 conference victories, and earned a third-seed spot and first-round bye in the conference tournament. Syracuse also received an at-large invitation to the NCAA Tournament, and advanced to the program's first-ever championship game, before losing 82–51 to Connecticut.

Previous season
The Orange finished the 2014–15 season 22–10, 11–5 in ACC play to finish in a tie for fourth place. They lost in the second round of the ACC women's tournament to Wake Forest. They received an at-large bid of the NCAA women's tournament where they defeated Nebraska in the first round before losing to South Carolina in the second round.

Roster

Schedule

|-
!colspan=9 style="background:#D44500; color:#212B6D;"|Non-conference regular season

|-
!colspan=9 style="background:#D44500; color:#212B6D;"| ACC regular season

|-
!colspan=9 style="background:#D44500; color:#212B6D;"| ACC Women's Tournament

|-
!colspan=9 style="background:#D44500; color:#212B6D;"| NCAA Women's Tournament

Rankings

See also
 2015–16 Syracuse Orange men's basketball team

References

Syracuse Orange women's basketball seasons
Syracuse
Syracuse
NCAA Division I women's basketball tournament Final Four seasons
Syracuse Orange
Syracuse Orange